Top Model. Zostań modelką, Cycle 2 (Polish for Top Model. Become a Model) is the second Cycle of an ongoing reality documentary based on Tyra Banks' America's Next Top Model that pits contestants from Poland against each other in a variety of competitions to determine who will win the title of the next Polish Top Model and a lucrative modeling contract with NEXT Model Management as well as an appearance on the cover of the Polish issue of Glamour and a nationwide Max Factor campaign in hopes of a successful future in the modeling business. The competition was hosted by Polish-born model Joanna Krupa who served as the lead judge alongside fashion designer Dawid Woliński, journalist Karolina Korwin-Piotrowska and photographer Marcin Tyszka.

The international destinations this cycle were Paris and Mombasa. The winner of the competition was 19-year-old Olga Kaczyńska from Wroclaw.

Contestants
(ages stated are at start of contest)

Episodes

Episode 1
Original Air Date: September 7, 2011

The judges begin their search for Poland's Next Top Model, and hold castings across the country.

Episode 2
Original Air Date: September 14, 2011

The search continues as hopefuls make their way into the semi-finals in the hope of becoming Poland's next top model.

Episode 3
Original Air Date: September 21, 2011

The remaining spots for the semi-finals are finally filled, and the top fifty contestants are taken to the Polish countryside. They take part in a lingerie fashion show, and it's goodbye for three of the semi-finalists as their dream comes to an end.

Episode 4
Original Air Date: September 28, 2011

The final round of boot-camp takes place. After an elimination, the remaining semi-finalists are challenged to perform in front of the camera with their fellow models. The girls are divided into four groups with different themes, all having to do with farm life.

Names in bold represent eliminated semi-finalists

After reviewing all the pictures, Joanna and the judges choose the final thirteen models who will compete for the title of Poland's Next Top Model.

Episode 5
Original Air Date: October 5, 2011

Challenge winner: Vera Suprunenko
First call-out: Asia Kudzbalska
Bottom three: Ania Bałon, Gabrysia Pacholarz & Karolina Henning
Eliminated: Karolina Henning
Featured photographer: Robert Wolański
Special guests: Anja Rubik

Episode 6
Original Air Date: October 12, 2011

Challenge winner: Viktoria Driuk
First call-out: Ania Bałon
Bottom three: Asia Kudzbalska, Dorota Trojanowska & Gabriela Pacholarz
Eliminated: Gabriela Pacholarz
Featured photographer: Daniel Duniak & Grzegorz Korzeniowski
Special guests:  Wayne Sterling

Episode 7
Original Air Date: October 19, 2011

First call-out: None, since there were no call-outs due to Magda being automatically eliminated from the competition for not participating in the photo shoot. In episode 8, however, Olga was told she would have been the first call-out had they been held.
Eliminated: Magda Roman
Featured photographer: Wojtek Wojtczak & Iza Grzybowska 
Special guests: Anja Rubik

Episode 8
Original Air Date: October 26, 2011

First call-out: Dorota Trojanowska
Bottom two: Asia Kudzbalska & Natalia Piaskowska
Eliminated: Natalia Piaskowska
Featured photographer: Łukasz Ziętek
Special guests: Magda Gessler, Martyna Wojciechowska, Teresa Rosati, Tomasz Jacyków, Ewa Minge, Robert Kupisz, Gosia Baczyńska

Episode 9
Original Air Date: November 2, 2011

Immune/first call-out: Michalina Manios
Bottom two: Ania Bałon & Vera Suprunenko
Disqualified: Vera Suprunenko
Featured photographer: Emil Biliński
Special guests: Kazimierz Mazur, Asia Jabłyczńska, Tomasz Schimscheiner

Episode 10
Original Air Date: November 9, 2011

First call-out: Asia Kudzbalska
Bottom three: Dorota Trojanowska, Oliwia Downar-Dukowicz & Viktoria Driuk
Eliminated: Viktoria Driuk
Featured photographer: Aldona Karczmarczyk
Special guests: Ania Jurgaś

Episode 11
Original Air Date: November 16, 2011

First call-out: Honorata Wojtkowska
Bottom four: Ania Bałon, Asia Kudzbalska, Dorota Trojanowska & Oliwia Downar-Dukowicz
Eliminated: Dorota Trojanowska & Oliwia Downar-Dukowicz
Featured photographer: Marcin Tyszka
Special guests: Peyman Amin

Episode 12
Original Air Date: November 23, 2011

First call-out: Olga Kaczyńska
Bottom two: Honorata Wojtkowska & Michalina Manios
Eliminated: Honorata Wojtkowska
Featured photographer: Andre Rau
Special guests: Vincent McDoom

Episode 13
Original Air Date: November 30, 2011

First call-out: Olga Kaczyńska
Bottom two: Asia Kudzbalska & Michalina Manios
Eliminated: Asia Kudzbalska
Featured photographer: Guillaume Malheiro
Special guests: Michał Piróg

Episode 14
Original Air Date: December 7, 2011

Final three: Ania Bałon, Michalina Manios & Olga Kaczyńska 
Eliminated: Michalina Manios
Final two: Ania Bałon & Olga Kaczyńska 
Poland's Next Top Model: Olga Kaczyńska 
Special guests: Anja Rubik, Joel Wilkenfeld (President of NEXT NY)

Summaries

Call-out order

 The contestant was eliminated
 The contestant was put through collectively to the next round
 The contestant was immune from elimination
 The contestant was disqualified from the competition
 The contestant was the original eliminee, but was saved
 The contestant won the competition

Episodes 1, 2, 3 and 4 were casting episodes. In episode 4, the pool of semi-finalists was reduced to the final 13 models who moved on to the main competition.
Episodes 5 and 6 featured the bottom three contestants who were in danger of elimination.
In episode 7, Magda was automatically eliminated from the competition at panel for not participating in the photo shoot. Therefore, no call-out was held that episode. In the next episode it was revealed that Olga would have received the best photo.
In episode 9, the best-performing contestant from each photo shoot pair was deemed immune to the panel. Earlier that week Vera had made a phone call from her cellphone, which was against the rules of the show. She was disqualified from the competition at panel when she landed in the bottom two, automatically saving Ania from elimination.
In episode 11, Ania, Dorota, Asia and Oliwia landed in the bottom four. Dorota was called and was told she was eliminated. Joanna handed the last two photos to Ania and Asia, eliminating Oliwia.

Bottom Two/Three/Four 

 The contestant was eliminated after their first time in the bottom two
 The contestant was eliminated after their second time in the bottom two
 The contestant was eliminated after their third time in the bottom two
 The contestant was eliminated after their fourth time in the bottom two
 The contestant quit the competition
 The contestant was disqualified for breaking the rules or eliminated due to not joining photo shoot. 
 The contestant was eliminated in the final judging and placed third.
 The contestant was eliminated in the final judging and placed second.

Photo shoot guide
Episode 4 photo shoot: Country girls in groups (semifinals)
Episode 5 photo shoot: Posing with nude male model Marcin Iwo Kosiński
Episode 6 photo shoot: Suspended in the air
Episode 7 photo shoot: Nude fashion editorial 
Episode 8 photo shoot: Food kitchen editorial
Episode 9 photo shoot: Film warriors
Episode 10 photo shoot: Portraying model stereotypes  
Episode 11 photo shoots: Hollywood icon impersonations; natural & sexy beauty
Episode 12 photo shoot: High fashion in the streets of Paris
Episode 13 photo shoot: Futuristic fashion
Episode 14 photo shoot: Glamour magazine covers & spreads in Kenya

Post Top Model agencies
Olga Kaczyńska: has been signed to D'Vision Models in Warsaw, NEXT Model Management in London, Paris and Milan, Chic Model Management in Sydney, and mc2 Models in Tel Aviv.
Ania Bałon: has been signed to D'Vision Models Classic board in Warsaw.
Asia Kudzbalska: has been signed to D'Vision Models in Warsaw, Elite Model Management in Tel Aviv, and Brave Model Management in Milan.
Honorata Wojtkowska: has been signed to D'Vision Models in Warsaw.
Oliwia Downar-Dukowicz: has been signed to D'Vision Models Classic board in Warsaw.
Viktoria Driuk: has been signed to D'Vision Models Classic board in Warsaw.
Vera Suprunenko: has been signed to D'Vision Models in Warsaw.
Magda Roman: has been signed to D'Vision Models in Warsaw.
Karolina Hennig: has been signed to D'Vision Models Classic board in Warsaw.

Ratings

References

 

1
2011 Polish television seasons